"Too Far Gone" is a song by Welsh singer-songwriter Lisa Scott-Lee. It was released on 8 September 2003 by Fontana Records as her second single release. It was written by Scott-Lee, Paul Newton, Daniel Sherman, Phillip Dyson and Peter Day, who also produced it. "Too Far Gone" debuted and peaked at number 11 on the UK Singles Chart.

Music video

The video for "Too Far Gone" features Scott-Lee performing in front of blue, pink and red backdrops with her dancers.

Track listings
UK CD1 
 "Too Far Gone"
 "Too Far Gone" (Illicit Pop Mix)
 "That's That"
 "Too Far Gone" (video)

UK CD2 and European CD single 
 "Too Far Gone"
 "Too Far Gone" (Almighty Mix)
 "Too Far Gone" (Bimbo Jones Mix)

Charts

References

2003 songs
2003 singles
Fontana Records singles
Lisa Scott-Lee songs